The National Federation of Energy and Mines (FNEM) is a trade union representing workers in the energy industry, and coal miners, in France.

The union was established on 20 June 2000, when the Miners' Federation merged with the National Federation of Energy and Gas.  Like its predecessors, it affiliated to Workers' Force.  It was initially led by Gabriel Gaudy.  It is based in Paris.

References

Energy industry trade unions
Mining trade unions
Trade unions in France
Trade unions established in 2000